Acrocirridae is a family of polychaete worms. Acrocirrids are detritivores (deposit feeders), catching falling particles with numerous long prostomial tentacles. There are eight known genera, and at least 21 described species and subspecies within the Acrocirridae. The acrocirrids are primarily benthic (seabed-dwelling) animals, but at least two genera (Swima and Teuthidodrilus) appear to have evolved or adapted to a pelagic (free-swimming) habitat.

Systematics
Following is a list of genera and species within the family Acrocirridae:
 Genus Acrocirrus Grube, 1873
 Acrocirrus aciculigerus Kudenov, 1976
 Acrocirrus bansei Magalhães & Bailey-Brock, 2012
 Acrocirrus columbianus Banse, 1979
 Acrocirrus crassifilis Moore, 1923
 Acrocirrus frontifilis (Grube, 1860)
 Acrocirrus heterochaetus Annenkova, 1934
 Acrocirrus incisa Kudenov, 1975
 Acrocirrus muroranensis Okuda, 1934
 Acrocirrus occipitalis Banse, 1979
 Acrocirrus okotensis Imajima, 1963
 Acrocirrus trisectus Banse, 1969
 Acrocirrus uchidai Okuda, 1934
 Acrocirrus validus Marenzeller, 1879
 Genus Chauvinelia Laubier, 1974
 Chauvinelia arctica Averincev, 1980
 Chauvinelia biscayensis Laubier, 1974
 Genus Flabelligella Hartman, 1965
 Flabelligella macrochaeta (Fauchald, 1972)
 Flabelligella mexicana Fauchald, 1972
 Flabelligella minuta Hartman, 1965
 Flabelligella papillata Hartman, 1965
 Genus Flabelligena Gillet, 2001
 Flabelligena amoureuxi Gillet, 2001
 Flabelligena biscayensis (Kolmer, 1985)
 Flabelligena cirrata (Hartman & Fauchald, 1971)
 Flabelligena erratica (Orensanz, 1974)
 Flabelligena gascognensis Aguirrezabalaga & Ceberio, 2006
 Flabelligena mediterranea (Kolmer, 1985)
 Genus Helmetophorus Hartman, 1978
 Helmetophorus rankini Hartman, 1978
 Genus Macrochaeta Grube, 1850 
 Macrochaeta australiensis Kudenov, 1976
 Macrochaeta bansei Hartmann-Schröder, 1974
 Macrochaeta clavicornis (M. Sars, 1835)
 Macrochaeta helgolandica Friedrich, 1937
 Macrochaeta leidyi (Verrill, 1882)
 Macrochaeta multipapillata Westheide, 1981
 Macrochaeta natalensis Hartmann-Schröder, 1996
 Macrochaeta papillosa Ehlers, 1913
 Macrochaeta pege Banse, 1969
 Macrochaeta polyonyx Eliason, 1962
 Macrochaeta sexoculata (Webster & Benedict, 1887)
 Macrochaeta westheidei Santos & Silva, 1993
 Genus Swima Osborn, Haddock, Pleijel, Madin & Rouse, 2009
 S. bombiviridis Osborn, Haddock, Pleijel, Madin & Rouse, 2009 (also known as Green Bomber Worm or Bombardier Worm), Monterey Bay, California
 Swima fulgida Osborn, Haddock & Rouse, 2011 
 Swima tawitawiensis Osborn, Haddock & Rouse, 2011
 Genus Teuthidodrilus Osborn, Madin & Rouse, 2011
 Teuthidodrilus samae Osborn, Madin & Rouse, 2011 (also known as Squidworm), Celebes Sea, East Indian Archipelago

See also
 Eumetazoa
 Bilateria
 Protostomia
 Spiralia
 Lophotrochozoa
 Trochophore

References

External links

Terebellida